The Gender Development Index (GDI) is an index designed to measure gender equality.

GDI, together with the Gender Empowerment Measure (GEM), was introduced in 1995 in the Human Development Report written by the United Nations Development Program. The aim of these measurements was to add a gender-sensitive dimension to the Human Development Index (HDI). The first measurement that they created as a result was the GDI. The GDI is defined as a "distribution-sensitive measure that accounts for the human development impact of existing gender gaps in the three components of the HDI" (Klasen 243).  Distribution sensitive means that the GDI takes into account not only the averaged or general level of well-being and wealth within a given country, but focuses also on how this wealth and well-being is distributed between different groups within society. The HDI and the GDI (as well as the GEM) were created to rival the more traditional general income-based measures of development such as gross domestic product (GDP) and gross national product (GNP).

Definition and calculation 
The GDI is often considered a "gender-sensitive extension of the HDI" (Klasen 245). It addresses gender-gaps in life expectancy, education, and incomes. It uses an "inequality aversion" penalty, which creates a development score penalty for gender gaps in any of the categories of the Human Development Index (HDI) which include life expectancy, adult literacy, school enrollment, and logarithmic transformations of per-capita income. In terms of life expectancy, the GDI assumes that women will live an average of five years longer than men. Additionally, in terms of income, the GDI considers income-gaps in terms of actual earned income. The GDI cannot be used independently from the HDI score, and so, it cannot be used on its own as an indicator of gender gaps. Only the gap between the HDI and the GDI can actually be accurately considered; the GDI on its own is not an independent measure of gender gaps.

Gender Development Index (2018) 
Below is a list of countries by their Gender Development Index, based on data collected in 2018, and published in 2019. Countries are grouped into five groups based on the absolute deviation from gender parity in HDI values, from 1 (closest to gender parity) to 5 (furthest from gender parity). This means that grouping takes equally into consideration gender gaps favoring males, as well as those favoring females.

Controversies

General debates 
In the years since its creation in 1995, much debate has arisen surrounding the reliability, and usefulness of the Gender Development Index (GDI) in making adequate comparisons between different countries and in promoting gender-sensitive development. The GDI is particularly criticized for being often mistakenly interpreted as an independent measure of gender gaps when it is not, in fact, intended to be interpreted in that way, because it can only be used in combination with the scores from the Human Development Index, but not on its own. Additionally, the data that is needed in order to calculate the GDI is not always readily available in many countries, making the measure very hard to calculate uniformly and internationally. There is also worry that the combination of so many different developmental influences in one measurement could result in muddled results and that perhaps the GDI (and the GEM) actually hide more than they reveal.

Debates surrounding the life expectancy adjustment 
More specifically, there has been a lot of debate over the life-expectancy component of the GDI. As was mentioned previously, the GDI life expectancy section is adjusted to assume that women will live, normally, five years longer than men. This provision has been debated, and it has been argued that if the GDI was really looking to promote true equality, it would strive to attain the same life-expectancy for women and men, despite what might be considered a biological advantage or not. However, this may seem paradoxical in terms of policy implications, because, theoretically, this could only be achieved through providing preferential treatment to males, effectively discriminating against females. Yet, UN provide a number of strategies and plans giving preferential treatment to women and girls, not only for health issues but also for education or job opportunities. Furthermore, it has been argued that the GDI does not account for sex-selective abortion, meaning that the penalty levied against a country for gender inequality is less because it affects less of the population (see Sen, Missing Women).

Debates surrounding income gaps 
Another area of debate surrounding the GDI is in the area of income gaps. The GDI considers income-gaps in terms of actual earned income. This has been said to be problematic because often, men may make more money than women, but their income is shared. Additionally, the GDI has been criticized because it does not consider the value of care work as well as other work performed in the informal sector (such as cleaning, cooking, housework, and childcare). Another criticism of the GDI is that it only takes gender into account as a factor for inequality; it does not, however, consider inequality among class, region or race, which could be very significant. Another criticism with the income-gap portion of the GDI is that it is heavily dependent on gross domestic product (GDP) and gross national product (GNP). For most countries, the earned-income gap accounts for more than 90% of the gender penalty.

Suggested alternatives 
As was suggested by Halis Akder in 1994, one alternative to the Gender Development Index (GDI) would be the calculation of a separate male and female Human Development Index (HDI). Another suggested alternative is the Gender Gap Measure which could be interpreted directly as a measure of gender inequality, instead of having to be compared to the HDI as the GDI is. It would average the female-male gaps in human development  and use a gender-gap in labor force participation instead of earned income. In the 2010 Human Development Report, another alternative to the GDI, namely, the Gender Inequality Index (GII) was proposed in order to address some of the shortcomings of the GDI. This new experimental measure contains three dimensions: Reproductive Health, Empowerment, and Labor Market Participation.

See also

 Indices

 American Human Development Report
 Bhutan GNH Index
 Broad measures of economic progress
 Disability-adjusted life year
 Economics
 Full cost accounting
 Gender Parity Index
 Genuine Progress Indicator (GPI)
 Global Peace Index
 Green gross domestic product (Green GDP)
 Green national product
 Gross National Happiness
 Gross National Well-being (GNW)
 Happiness economics
 Happy Planet Index (HPI)
 Human Development Index (HDI)
 Human Poverty Index
 ISEW (Index of sustainable economic welfare)
 Legatum Prosperity Index
 Leisure satisfaction
 Living planet index
 Millennium Development Goals (MDGs)
 Money-rich, time-poor
 National Human Development Report
 OECD Better Life Index BLI
 Post-materialism
 Progress (history)
 Progressive utilization theory
 Psychometrics
 Subjective life satisfaction
 Where-to-be-born Index
 Wikiprogress
 World Happiness Report (WHR)
 World Values Survey (WVS)

References

External links 

 UNDP page on the Gender Development Index

Gender equality
International rankings
United Nations Development Programme
1995 introductions